When Heroes Lie is a 2012 Finnish documentary film directed by Arto Halonen.

References

External links 

2012 documentary films
2012 films
Finnish documentary films
2010s Finnish-language films